European Pool Championship (also called Dynamic European Championships) is a pool competition organized by the European Pocket Billiard Federation (EPBF). The tournament is held annually since 1980. It should not be confused with the series of smaller events known as the Euro Tour, also run by the EPBF. 

Current disciplines include 8-ball, 9-Ball, 10-Ball, Straight pool, and team events), and for different age and ability ranges, with events for men, women, juniors and wheelchair players.

Tournament history 
Sources:

Men

Women

Wheelchair

Men's teams

Women's teams

References

External links
Home page

 
Pool
Pool competitions